Susan 'Sue' D. Duckworth is an American politician and a Democratic member of the Utah House of Representatives representing District 22 since January 1, 2009. She was married to former Democratic Representative Carl W. Duckworth, whom she succeeded, until his death in May, 2018.

Early life and career
Born in Magna, Utah, Duckworth attended Salt Lake Community College and the University of Utah. She works as a caregiver and lives in Magna, Utah with her husband Carl. She is the mother of four children.

Political career
2014
Duckworth was unopposed for the June 24, 2014 Democratic primary. She faced Republican nominee William "Bill" Both and the Constitution party nominee Marilee Roose in the general election on November 4, 2014. Duckworth won with 2,709 votes (51.6%).

2012
Duckworth was unopposed for the June 26, 2012 Democratic primary and won the November 6, 2012 general election with 6,402 votes (73.3%) against Constitution nominee Marilee Roose, who had run for the seat in 2006.

2010
Duckworth was unopposed for the June 22, 2010 Democratic primary and won the November 2, 2010 general election with 3,334 votes (52.1%) against Republican nominee Noel Fields.

2008 
When District 22 Democratic Representative Carl Duckworth left the Legislature and left the seat open, Duckworth was selected from three candidates by the Democratic convention and won the November 4, 2008 general election with 6,600 votes (76.2%) against Constitution candidate Thomas Mangum.

During the 2016 legislative session, Duckworth served on the Natural Resources, Agriculture, and Environmental Quality Appropriations Subcommittee, the House Business and Labor Committee, as well as the House Natural Resources, Agriculture and Environment Committee.

2016 sponsored legislation

Duckworth passed one of the three bills she proposed, giving her a 33% passage rate. She did not floor sponsor any Senate bills.

References

External links
Official page at the Utah State Legislature
Campaign site
Sue Duckworth at Ballotpedia
Sue Duckworth at the National Institute on Money in State Politics

 

Place of birth missing (living people)
Year of birth missing (living people)
Living people
Democratic Party members of the Utah House of Representatives
Politicians from Salt Lake City
Salt Lake Community College alumni
University of Utah alumni
Women state legislators in Utah
21st-century American politicians
21st-century American women politicians
People from Magna, Utah